Mohammed Abdul Sattar (Arabic:
محمد عبد الستار) (born 1958, Tartus) is the current  Minister of Awqaf of Syria, serving since 2007.

Early life and education and career
Sattar was born into a Sunni Muslim family in the multicultural and multireligious town of Tartus in 1958. He has a Degree in Economy and Trade (1980) and PhD in Islamic Studies (2000) from Damascus University.

Career 
From 1985 until 2002 he was the Director of Religious Endowments and Mufti of Tartous Province.  He was subsequently appointed Assistant Minister of Religious Endowments for Religious Affairs in 2002.  In 2007 he became the Minister of Religious Endowments for Religious Affairs (Awqaf) of Syria.

President Bashar al-Assad is a member of the Alawites sect of Shia Muslims who are in the minority yet form the elite of the military officers. They rule over the  majority religious group the Sunni. When the Syrian uprising began in March 2011 Sattar was one of several Sunni who supported the regime.

In July 2016 President Bashar al-Assad announced the make up of the new Syrian government in Decree no. 203 of  2016.  Dr Mohammed Abdul-Sattar al-Sayyed retained his position.

As minister he has participated in several conferences and delivered lectures. At the Kiwan mosque during the 2015 International Media Conference Against Terrorism Sattar spoke of the martyrs who have defended the faith in Syria in the war against Takfiri Terrorism.

Sattar has been on the U.S.Department of the Treasury Office of Foreign Assets Control Specially Designated Nationals and Blocked Persons List since 2012. This means their assets are blocked and United States citizens are not permitted to have dealings with them. He is also listed on the Consolidated list of Financial Sanctions Targets in the UK last updated 2 June 2016. The European Union also has "restrictive measures against Syria" and added Dr. Mohammad Abdul Sattar Al Sayed to the list of persons 16 October 2012 as he "shares responsibility for the regime’s violent repression against the civilian population."

Contact with other religious groups in Syria 
The religious majority in Syria are Sunni Muslims who are around 70% of the population while Christians are around 10%.  Although Christians are a minority they have been politically influential and after the uprising many militant Christians supported Bashar al-Assad in the hope that this will offer some protection against Islamists coming to power.   Sattar has worked with Christians to keep the lines of communications open and to encourage Christian support for the government and its aims. In March 2013 at the Preachers and Imans in the Middle and Coastal Regions Forum held in Tartous the Minister spoke of Christians and Muslims working together to spread tolerance and friendship.  In June 2014 Sattar with a delegation of Muslim scholars visited the newly installed Patriarch of Antioch Mor Ignatius Aphrem II of the Syrian Orthodox Church.  Both expressed the view that Muslims and Christians should cooperate and work together for peace.

Personal life
Sattar is married and has three children.

See also
Council of Ministers (Syria)

References

External links
Ministry of Aqwaf official government website

1958 births
Living people
Syrian ministers of Awqaf
Damascus University alumni
People from Tartus
Arab Socialist Ba'ath Party – Syria Region politicians
Syrian Sunni Muslims